The Hubert H Humphrey Fellowship Program, offered by Bureau of Educational and Cultural Affairs of the U.S. Department of State, is an exchange program for young and mid-career professionals from developing countries and nations undergoing democratic transition. The one-year long non-degree graduate level study program focuses on leadership development, and collaboration with U.S. counterparts. The Program, which was established to honor the public service career of the late Senator and Vice President, Hubert H. Humphrey, began in 1978. Fourteen major universities in the United States, which are  chosen for their excellence in the Program's designated fields of study and for the resources, host Humphrey Fellows. Each year, approximately,  200 fellowships are awarded. Since 1978, more than 4,600 Fellows from 157 countries have participated in the program. Primary funding for this fellowship comes from the U.S. Congress. The following universities host the Humphrey Fellows.

 American University, Washington College of Law
 Arizona State University
 Boston University
 Cornell University
 Emory University
 Massachusetts Institute of Technology
 Michigan State University
 Pennsylvania State University
 Syracuse University
 University of California, Davis
 University of Maryland, College Park
 University of Minnesota, Humphrey School of Public Affairs
 Vanderbilt University
 Virginia Commonwealth University
 References

Fellowships